Garret C. Stires (October 13, 1849 – June 13, 1933) was a Major League Baseball right fielder in the 19th century.  He played for the Rockford Forest Citys of the National Association in 1871.  He was a native of Hunterdon County, New Jersey.

As the Forest Citys starting right fielder, Stires was the team leader in runs batted in (24) and slugging percentage (.473).  In 25 games, he hit .273 (30-for-110) with four doubles, six triples, two home runs, and 23 runs scored. He made 7 errors in 43 total chances in the outfield.

Stires died at the age of 83 in Oregon, Illinois.

External links
Baseball Reference

1849 births
1933 deaths
19th-century baseball players
Major League Baseball right fielders
Baseball players from New Jersey
Rockford Forest Citys (NABBP) players
Rockford Forest Citys players
Sportspeople from Hunterdon County, New Jersey